John S. Moiseichik (June 5, 1920 – April 16, 2016) was an American professional basketball player. He played in the National Basketball League for the Syracuse Nationals during the 1946–47 season and averaged 1.8 points per game. At SUNY Cortland he played on both the football and basketball teams.

References

External links
SUNY Cortland Hall of Fame profile

1920 births
2016 deaths
United States Army personnel of World War II
American men's basketball players
Basketball players from New York (state)
Cortland Red Dragons football players
Cortland Red Dragons men's basketball players
Guards (basketball)
High school football coaches in New York (state)
People from Cortland, New York
Syracuse Nationals players